The RDO Building is an 18-story building located in downtown Fargo, North Dakota. It is became the city's tallest building in 2020, surpassing the Radisson Blu since 1985, and is the second tallest building in the state behind the North Dakota State Capitol in Bismarck. The building was formally named Block 9 Tower until the R.D. Offutt corporation purchased the naming rights of the building.  The building is owned and operated by the Kilbourne Group.

Occupants
R.D. Offutt
Jasper Hotel (Aparium Hotel Group)
Dot's Pretzels

References

Buildings and structures in Fargo, North Dakota
Buildings and structures completed in 2020